Love Me More may refer to:

 "Love Me More" (Sam Smith song), 2022
 "Love Me More" (Trippie Redd song), 2019
 "Love Me More", a 2017 song by Chase & Status featuring Emeli Sandé from Tribe
 "Love Me More", a 2011 song recorded by Meghan Trainor
 "Love Me More", a song by Mitski from the 2022 album Laurel Hell